Seyyed Assadollah Mousavi ;  was a senator and member of the National Consultative Assembly.
Mousavi ran for the National Assembly for the first time, from Dasht-e Mishan, Bani-Tarf and Susangard constituencies on February 20, 1980. Mousavi could receive 10,362 votes. He also  was the elected senator of Khuzestan.

Death 
Seyed Asadullah Mousavi, was killed in his detention center in Behbahan on July 12 th 1979.

References 

20th-century Iranian politicians
Members of the 20th Iranian Majlis
Members of the 19th Iranian Majlis
Members of the 18th Iranian Majlis
Members of the 15th Iranian Majlis